"Limitless" is a song performed by British record producer Burns, released in the United Kingdom on 10 May 2013, as a digital download on iTunes. The song features English singer Clare Maguire and was written by Maguire and Burns.

Track listing

Charts

Release history

References

2013 singles
2013 songs
Burns (musician) songs
Sony Music singles
Songs written by Clare Maguire